Rangrim station is a railway station in Rangrim-ŭp, Rangrim County, Chagang Province, North Korea, the terminus of the narrow-gauge Kanggye Line of the Korean State Railway.

History

Rangrim station, originally called Tongmun'gŏri station (동문거리 (東門巨里)), was opened along with the rest of the Kanggye Line by the Korean State Railway in 1948. It received its current name in 1953.

References

Railway stations in North Korea